Qaleh-ye Now (also Romanized as Qal`eh-ye Now; also known as Qalehno) is a village in Pain Jovin Rural District, Helali District, Joghatai County, Razavi Khorasan Province, Iran. At the 2006 census, its population was 757, in 201 families.

References 

Populated places in Joghatai County